In the early colonial history of the United States, higher education was designed for men only. Since the 1800s, women's positions and opportunities in the educational sphere have increased. Since the late 1970s and early 1980s, women have surpassed men in number of bachelor's degrees and master's degrees conferred annually in the United States and women have continuously been the growing majority ever since, with men comprising a continuously lower minority in earning either degree. The same asymmetry has occurred with Doctorate degrees since 2005 with women being the continuously growing majority and men a continuously lower minority.

Statistics
Since the early 1970s, women have surpassed men in terms of college enrollment and graduation rates.

According to Ellen DuBois and Lynn Dumenil, they estimate that the number of bachelor and doctorate degrees from 1950–1980 for women are:

The statistics for enrollment of women in higher education in the 1930s varies depending upon the type of census performed in that year.

According to the U.S. Office of Education, the total number of enrollment for women in higher education the U.S. in 1930 was 480,802. This information was gathered by the U.S. Office of Education on a biannual basis, and reflects an estimate for the academic year (Fall 1929 - Spring 1930).

The U.S. Department of Commerce and Bureau of the Census performed a preliminary estimate for the same year (1930) of women in higher education in the U.S. The total number was 481,000 enrolled. This estimate was based on a calendar year census, in contrast to the academic year estimate performed by the U.S. Office of Education in the same year.

Surpassing equality and overrepresentation
Total undergraduate degree figures show that females outnumbered their male counterparts for the first time in the late 1970s. However, since 1981, women have steadily been outpacing men in bachelor's degrees earned, from only a 1% lead in 1980 to 33% advantage in 2015. Which means for every 100 males that graduate, 134 women do, however women have an additional privilege, "5,864 verified private scholarships, showed that there are 4 times as many scholarships specifically designated for women as opposed to those for men.".

Graph of Degree Attainment over time

History

Colonial
In Colonial America elementary education was widespread in New England, but limited elsewhere. New England Puritans believed it was necessary to study the Bible, so boys and girls were taught to read at an early age. It was also required that each town pay for a primary school. About 10 percent enjoyed secondary schooling. Few girls attended formal schools, but most were able to get some education at home or at so-called "Dame schools" where women taught basic reading and writing skills in their own houses. By 1750, nearly 90% of New England's women and almost all of its men could read and write. There was no higher education for women.

Tax-supported schooling for girls began as early as 1767 in New England. It was optional and some towns proved reluctant. Northampton, Massachusetts, for example, was a late adopter because it had many rich families who dominated the political and social structures and they did not want to pay taxes to aid poor families. Northampton assessed taxes on all households, rather than only on those with children, and used the funds to support a grammar school to prepare boys for college. Not until after 1800 did Northampton educate girls with public money. In contrast, the town of Sutton, Massachusetts, was diverse in terms of social leadership and religion at an early point in its history. Sutton paid for its schools by means of taxes on households with children only, thereby creating an active constituency in favor of universal education for both boys and girls.

Historians point out that reading and writing were different skills in the colonial era.  School taught both, but in places without schools reading was mainly taught to boys and also a few privileged girls. Men handled worldly affairs and needed to read and write. Girls only needed to read (especially religious materials). This educational disparity between reading and writing explains why the colonial women often could read, but could not write and could not sign their names—they used an "X".

Across the South, there was very little public schooling. Most parents either home schooled their children using peripatetic tutors or sent them to small local private schools. A study of women's signatures in Georgia indicates a high degree of literacy in areas with schools. In South Carolina, scores of school projects were advertised in the South Carolina Gazette beginning in 1732.

Early colonial ideology 
Ideologies held by the majority of early colonial society regarding women's access to education contributed greatly to the lack of opportunity for education among these women. Seventeenth-century attitudes did not stress significant importance on women's education, as evidenced by early opinions in the New England colonies. This majority also considered their access to education as unnecessary or dangerous, as their commonly held roles as mothers prevented society from seeing other possible abilities that would demand a need for education. The primary source of respect among these colonial New England women derived from their completion of domestic tasks, not a desire for or fulfillment of intellectual practices.

Structurally, men undoubtedly held a much greater position of power and control than women, as proves true historically. As a result of this imbalance, an inferior perspective to which women became viewed under carried over into intellectual opportunities. Overall, their abilities were not considered level with those of their male counterparts, so no pressing need to further develop their intellect was acknowledged.

However, as samplers and penbooks show,, female children developed basic literacy. Most mothers were able to teach young children at home, and women like Anne Bradstreet and Philis Wheatley wrote published poetry. Samuel Sewall's diary references describe his children, boys and girls alike, taking turns reading Scriptures at night, and being praised equally for doing well. The 1770 diarist Anne Winslow Green wrote to tell her mother that her Aunt Deeming was quite literate, correcting her letters home; this same woman later recounted her own appeals for aid when, as a Tory during the American Revolutionary War, she tried to escape with a carriage of furniture and other belongings after the Siege of Boston was lifted. But resistance to the admission of upper levels of education persisted.

These public attitudes that did not recognize a need for women's education eventually changed. The number of advocates for women's improved access to educational institutions grew gradually. New England's town school in Farmington, Connecticut saw a push for the school to include young girls as well as boys by a minority of people in 1687, a battle which would then extend into the next few centuries.

19th century
In the first half of the 19th century, only a minority of American children, both girls and boys, spent any meaningful time in a classroom. An even smaller minority received any secondary education.  For girls in particular the emphasis was on a "ladylike atmosphere" and "cultivation." In 1821, Emma Willard established her Female Seminary, and in a model much copied, focused young women on fitting into their "place in society." She thought the notion of female college graduates "absurd." Elizabeth Cady Stanton, a graduate of Willard's Seminary, was resentful of this attitude, a formative experience that contributed to her feminist activism in later life. At the college level, a few private schools followed Oberlin's 1833 example of enrolling women, but notably the state schools restricted admission to men.

The second half of the 19th century, on the other hand, produced relatively rapid gains for women's education in the United States. The founding of Vassar in 1865 was followed by Wellesley in 1875, Smith in the same year, Bryn Mawr in 1885, Radcliffe in 1879, and Barnard in 1889. Such institutions were fed by a steady stream of female high school graduates, who throughout this period comprised a majority of graduates. High school enrollment trebled in the 1890s, with girls continuing to represent the lion's share. The expansion of both secondary and tertiary public education that began in 1867 and lasted until the early 20th century created greater opportunities for women. Between 1867 and 1915, 304 new colleges and universities were established, bringing the American total to 563 such institutions. On the liberal arts faculties of state colleges such as Colorado, Iowa, Kansas, Minnesota, Nebraska, Texas, and Washington, women outnumbered men; indeed, the president of the University of Wisconsin was urging quota restrictions.

20th century
Coinciding with the beginnings of the first wave of feminism in the 20th century came the attempt by women to gain equal rights to education in the United States.   After long battles against gender oppression women finally obtained the right to be educated through several government acts/conventions, the opening of facilities willing to educate them, and the opportunity to continue into higher education.

Before the education reform that occurred during the Progressive Era, boys and girls often had different course programs of study. It was not uncommon for girls to be educated towards the jobs society deemed appropriate, such as secretary, journalist, or social-service worker. The idea of a "differentiated curriculum" between boys and girls was common throughout schools in the United States. This caused the high school education system to become a more "efficient site for the construction of gender".  During this time, there was a push to make women a better "domesticated citizen" rather than a scholar. The voices of many women were just beginning to be heard in society as well as the education system, but there was still opposition from some as to the credibility of their words. Girls of different races and ethnicities were also entering the public school system at this time. Often, the course of scholarly study was impacted by the race of the individual.

1930s
Education was a controversial topic in the 1930s, " and sex-segregated school systems protected “the virtue of female high school students.”  ."  Home economics and industrial education were new elements of the high school curriculum unmistakably designed for women's occupations. These classes taught women practical skills such as sewing, cooking, and using the new domestic inventions of the era; unfortunately, this “formal training offered women little advantage in the struggle for stable work at a liveable wage.”

The 1930s also saw tremendous changes in women's education at the college level. In 1900, there were 85,338 female college students in the United States and 5,237 earned their bachelor's degrees; by 1940, there were 600,953 female college students and 77,000 earned bachelor's degrees. This increase was partially explained by the “contemporary discourse that reinforced the need for higher education for women in their positions as wives, mothers, citizens, and professionals.”

Because the proper role for a white, middle-class woman in 1930s American society was that of wife and mother, arguments in favor of women's education emphasized concepts of eugenics and citizenship. Education showed women how to exercise their civic responsibilities, and it showed them the importance of the vote. Participation in student government trained women “early to become leaders later.” One study showed that in 1935, 62 percent of women college graduates voted compared to only 50 percent of women who did not attend college.

The basic assumption in the 1930s was that women should marry. There was also the perception that college educated women were less likely to marry, either because they “waited too long” or because the college experience which broadened their minds deluded them into believing “marriage should be between equals.” Others argued college made women better wives and mothers because it “imparted practical skills.”

In addition, the 1930s marked great economic hardship in the United States with the start of the Great Depression. At this point in history, a college major was expected to be a practical one. As difficult financial times neared, needing to justify college expenses became very real for women and their families. A study in 1924 that surveyed nearly sixteen-hundred woman PhD recipients concluded that seventy percent required grants, scholarships, and fellowships in order to cover the expense associated with earning a higher degree. Despite the financial support, the majority of these women were required to save money for years before pursuing their degrees because the aid was never enough. Despite these disadvantages, the 1930s marked the peak of woman PhD earners. These degrees varied in fields and began to legitimize fields for women that were once off-limits.

The "self-support" that these women engaged in to help finance their education became a widely accepted necessity. Both men and women were forced to find ways of supporting their education at this period of time. To help lessen the financial burden faced by families trying to educate their children, the National Youth Administration was created by the United States Government. Between 1935 and 1943, the NYA spent nearly 93 million dollars providing financial assistance. Despite the growing increasing opportunities for women in education, there was a constant need to justify the expense. As the number of college graduates increased, those who were displaced during the Great Depression had to compete with a younger and more-educated group of people.

The 1930s also marked the 10th anniversary of Women's suffrage in the United States. Despite earning the right to vote, women were still largely refused any role in positions of political power that allow them to make political change for their gender. Despite growing numbers of women graduates, many were denied positions that they were qualified for in favor of men. This struggle sparked new examples of political activism and increased support for an Equal Rights Amendment.

Areas of study

Teaching and nursing were the top two fields for women throughout the 1930s, but home economics also experienced a great surge in popularity during the Depression. Home economics brought a scientific language to the traditional women's sphere of the home and raised “homemaking to the status of a respectable--though definitely female--occupation.” Social work, child development, and nursery school educational programs were also popular.

In addition to this strong vocational orientation in American education during the opening decades of the twentieth century, women began to make slow inroads into traditionally male dominated areas of education such as business, science, medicine, architecture, engineering, and law. Women were also able to gain positions of responsibility within the federal government because of the watershed events of the New Deal.

Women's colleges

Prior to the American Civil War few colleges admitted women. Founded in 1772 as a primary school, Salem College is the oldest female educational establishment. However, it did not award college degrees until 1890.

Some were founded as co-educational institutions; Oberlin Collegiate Institute, after 1850 Oberlin College, founded in 1833, was the first college to accept both women and African Americans as students.

Other early coeducational schools included Hillsdale College, founded as Michigan Central College in Spring Arbor, Michigan in 1844, the short-lived New-York Central College in McGraw, New York (1849–1860), and Antioch College, founded by noted educator Horace Mann in 1852 in Yellow Springs, Ohio. Hollins University, founded as the co-educational Valley Union Seminary in Roanoke, Virginia, in 1842; it became all female in 1852;

A number of colleges were founded before the Civil War with all-female student bodies, including (among others, in addition to Salem): Mount Holyoke College of South Hadley, Massachusetts, founded in 1837 by Mary Lyon as Mount Holyoke Female Seminary; Wesleyan College of Macon, Georgia, founded in 1836 as Georgia Female College, and is the first college in the world chartered to grant degrees to women;  Queens College (now Queens University) of Charlotte, North Carolina, founded in 1857 as Charlotte Female Institute; Averett College (now Averett University) of Danville, Virginia, founded in 1859 as Union women's College; and Vassar College, founded in Poughkeepsie, New York in 1861.

With the start of the war many males were in uniform so more opportunities arose for women to fill the empty space in schools and the universities became more willing to admit the women.  Slowly more educational institutions opened their doors to women; today, there are 60 women's colleges in the United States offering educational programs that parallel co-educational universities both in subject matter and in quality.

Government action
In 1848 the Seneca Falls Convention was held in New York to gain support for education and suffrage  but it had little immediate impact. This convention is significant because it created a foundation for efforts toward equal education for women, even though it was not actually achieved until much later.

The Morrill Land-Grant Colleges Act of 1862 founded universities to educate both men and women in practical fields of study, though women's courses were still centered around home economics. By 1870 30% of colleges were co-educational, later in the 1930s women-only colleges were established that expanded opportunities for courses of study to include more intellectual development as opposed to domestic instruction.

In July 1975 “Title IX regulations became effective as law” (Margaret Fund of NWLC, 2012).  The law provided one year for compliance to elementary schools and three years for compliance to high schools and post secondary institutions.   Through the 1970s the law's enactment, opposition towards the legislation, and initial compliance for the law were the focus.  According to the Margaret Fund (2012), in 1982 a court case was won upholding the nondiscriminatory acts in employment, the case title is as follows, 1982 North Haven Bd. of Ed. v. Bell, 456 U.S. 512 (1982).  In 1984, the case Grove City v. Bell, 465 U.S. 555 (1984) a, “U.S. Supreme Court decision held that federal spending clause statutes only apply to those programs or activities that receive direct federal financial assistance, effectively ending Title IX applicability to athletics” (Margaret Fund of NWLC).  This decision is later remedied in the late 1980s by the Civil Rights Restoration Act of 1987.  In 1988, this act was passed by Congress and reversed the damage from the Grove City v. Bell decision.  The Margaret Fund (2012) states, “It over-rode the Grove City v. Bell decision by expanding the definition of program or activity that receives Federal financial assistance” (Margaret Fund of NWLC, para.5).  During the 1990s three significant changes or continuations to the law were made in the course of the decade.  First, a Supreme Court decision allowed an individual to sue for monetary retributions by citing the Title IX Act.  Second, the disclosure act in 1994 stated that all institutions under Title IX were to report publicly on their operations, with an effective implementation date set for 1996.  Third, the ORC distributed requirements to institutions and schools which are explained and outlined more clearly the regulations for Title IX.  The significant events in the 2000s allow schools to use e-mail surveys, and due to a Supreme Court case in 2009, lawsuits on the basis of sexual discrimination under Title IX can be brought by parents.

Timeline

1727: Founded in 1727 by the Sisters of the Order of Saint Ursula, Ursuline Academy, New Orleans, enjoys the distinction of being both the oldest continuously operating school for girls and the oldest Catholic school in the United States.

1742: Moravians in Pennsylvania established the first all-girls boarding school in America, the Bethlehem Female Seminary to serve the Moravian community in and near Bethlehem. In 1863 it became a college. In 1913 it became Moravian Seminary and College for Women. Historians  accept Moravian as the oldest—though not continuously operational because of its current co-ed status—specifically female institute of higher learning in the United States.

1772: Salem Academy and College began as a school for young girls in 1772 in the Moravian town of Salem, North Carolina which had been established just six years earlier by Moravian missionaries. It is the oldest educational institution for both girls and women in the United States.

1783: Washington College in Chestertown, Maryland, appointed the first women instructors at any American college. Elizabeth Callister Peale and Sarah Callister taught painting and drawing.

1803: Bradford Academy in Bradford, Massachusetts was the first higher educational institution to admit women in Massachusetts. It was founded as a co-educational institution, but became exclusively for women in 1837.

1826: The first American public high schools for girls were opened in New York and Boston.

1828: The South Carolina Female Collegiate Institute was founded in Columbia, South Carolina.

1829: The first public examination of an American girl in geometry was held.

1831: As a private institution in 1831, Mississippi College became the first coeducational college in the United States to grant a degree to a woman. In December 1831 it granted degrees to two women, Alice Robinson and Catherine Hall.
Ingham University in Le Roy, New York, was the first women's college in New York State and the first chartered women's university in the United States. It was founded in 1835 as the Attica (NY) Female Seminary by Mariette and Emily E. Ingham, who moved the school to Le Roy in 1837. The school was chartered on April 6, 1852 as the Ingham Collegiate Institute, and a full university charter was granted in April 1857. After financial difficulties, the college closed in 1892 and its property was sold at auction in 1895.[1] Over several years, the college's former buildings were demolished; the stone from the Arts Conservatory, the last campus building to be dismantled, was used to build the Woodward Memorial Library at the same location in Le Roy.[2]

Ingham University was the alma mater of Sarah Frances Whiting, who later founded the physics department and establish the astronomical observatory at Wellesley College.[3]
1836: Georgia Female College (now Wesleyan College), Macon, Georgia: It is the oldest (and the first) school which was established from inception as a full college for women offering the same education as men. Awarded the first known baccalaureate degree to a woman.

1837: Bradford Academy in Bradford, Massachusetts, due to declining enrollment, became a single-sexed institution for the education of women exclusively.

1837: Mount Holyoke College, first called Mount Holyoke Seminary, was founded by Mary Lyon in South Hadley, Massachusetts.

1844: Margaret Fuller is the first woman permitted to use the Harvard College library

1849: Elizabeth Blackwell, born in England, became the first woman to earn a medical degree from an American college, Geneva Medical College in New York.

1850: Lucy Sessions earned a literary degree from Oberlin College, becoming the first African American woman in the United States to receive a college degree.

1851: The Adelphean Society, now called Alpha Delta Pi Women's Fraternity, was founded at Wesleyan Female College in Macon, Georgia and became the first secret society for women.

1855: The University of Iowa becomes the first coeducational public or state university in the United States.

1858: Mary Fellows became the first woman west of the Mississippi River to receive a baccalaureate degree (from Cornell College).

1862: Mary Jane Patterson became the first African-American woman to earn a BA in 1862. She earned her degree from Oberlin College.

1863: Mary Corinna Putnam Jacobi graduated from the New York College of Pharmacy in 1863, which made her the first woman to graduate from a United States school of pharmacy.

1864: Rebecca Crumpler became the first African-American woman to graduate from a U.S. college with a medical degree and the first and only African-American woman to obtain the Doctress of Medicine degree from New England Female Medical College in Boston, MA.

1866: Lucy Hobbs Taylor became the first American woman to earn a dental degree, which she earned from the Ohio College of Dental Surgery.

1866: Sarah Jane Woodson Early became the first African-American woman to serve as a professor. Xenia, Ohio's Wilberforce University hired her to teach Latin and English in 1866.

1869: Fanny Jackson Coppin was named principal of the Institute for Colored Youth in Philadelphia, becoming the first African-American woman to head an institution for higher learning in the United States.

1870: Ada Kepley became the first American woman to earn a law degree, from Northwestern School of Law.

1870: Ellen Swallow Richards became the first American woman to earn a degree in chemistry, which she earned from Vassar College in 1870.

1871: Frances Elizabeth Willard became the first female college president in the United States, as president of Evanston College for Ladies in Illinois.

1871: Harriette Cooke became the first woman college professor in the United States appointed full professor with a salary equal to her male peers.

1871: Japanese women are allowed to study in the USA (though not yet in Japan itself).

1873: Linda Richards became the first American woman to earn a degree in nursing.

1877: Helen Magill White became the first American woman to earn a Ph.D., which she earned at Boston University in the subject of Greek.

1878: Mary L. Page became the first American woman to earn a degree in architecture, which she earned from the University of Illinois, Urbana-Champaign.

1879: Mary Eliza Mahoney became the first African-American in the U.S. to earn a diploma in nursing, which she earned from the School of Nursing, New England Hospital for Woman and Children in Boston.

1881: American Association of University Women founded.

1883: Susan Hayhurst became the first woman to receive a pharmacy degree in the United States, which she received from the Philadelphia College of Pharmacy.

1886: Winifred Edgerton Merrill became the first American woman to earn a PhD in mathematics, which she earned from Columbia University.

1889: Maria Louise Baldwin became the first African-American female principal in Massachusetts and the Northeast, supervising white faculty and a predominantly white student body at the Agassiz Grammar School in Cambridge.

1889: Susan La Flesche Picotte became the first Native American woman to earn a medical degree, which she earned from  Woman's Medical College of Pennsylvania.

1890: Ida Gray became the first African-American woman to earn a Doctor of Dental Surgery degree, which she earned from the University of Michigan.

1892: Laura Eisenhuth became the first woman elected to state office as Superintendent of Public Instruction.

1894: Margaret Floy Washburn became the first woman to be officially awarded the PhD degree in psychology, which she earned at Cornell University under E. B. Titchener.

Late 1800s, exact date unknown: Anandibai Joshi from India, Keiko Okami from Japan, and Sabat Islambouli from Syria became the first women from their respective countries (and in Joshi's case the first Hindu woman) to get a degree in western medicine, which they each got from the Women's Medical College of Pennsylvania (WMCP), where they were all students in 1885.

1900: Otelia Cromwell became the first African-American woman to graduate from Smith College in Northampton, Massachusetts.

1903:  Mignon Nicholson became the first woman in North America to earn a veterinary degree, which she earned from McKillip Veterinary College in Chicago, Illinois.

1904: Helen Keller graduated from Radcliffe, becoming the first deafblind person to earn a Bachelor of Arts degree.

1905: Nora Stanton Blatch Barney, born in England, became the first woman to earn a degree in any type of engineering in the United States, which she earned from Cornell University. It was a degree in civil engineering.

1908: Alpha Kappa Alpha sorority, the first African-American Greek letter organization for woman, was founded at Howard University.

1909: Ella Flagg Young became the first female superintendent of a large city school system.

1915: Lillian Gilbreth earned a PhD in industrial psychology from Brown University, which was the first degree ever granted in industrial psychology. Her dissertation was titled "Some Aspects of Eliminating Waste in Teaching".

1917: Sigma Delta Tau sorority, a Jewish women's Greek letter organization was founded at Cornell University in response to antisemitism.

1918: The College of William & Mary admitted 24 women to the entering undergraduate class.

1921: Sadie Tanner Mossell became the first African-American woman to earn a Ph.D. in the U.S. when she earned a Ph.D. in Economics from the University of Pennsylvania

1922: Sigma Gamma Rho sorority was founded. It was the fourth African-American Greek letter organization for women, and the first African-American sorority established on a predominantly white campus, Butler University in Indianapolis, Indiana.

1922: Lorna Myrtle Hodgkinson became the first woman to earn a Ph.D. from Harvard, which she earned in education.

1923: Virginia Proctor Powell Florence became the first African-American woman to earn a degree in library science. She earned the degree in 1923 from the Carnegie Library School, which later became part of the University of Pittsburgh.

1925: Zora Neale Hurston became the first African-American woman to be admitted to Barnard college.

1926: Dr. May Edward Chinn became the first African-American woman to graduate from the University and Bellevue Hospital Medical College.

1929: Jenny Rosenthal Bramley, born in Moscow, became the first woman to earn a Ph.D. in physics in the United States, which she earned from New York University.

1931: Jane Matilda Bolin was the first African-American woman to graduate from Yale Law School.

1932: Dorothy B. Porter became the first African-American woman to earn an advanced degree in library science (MLS) from Columbia University.

1933: Inez Beverly Prosser became the first African-American woman to earn a PhD in psychology, which she earned from the University of Cincinnati.

1934: Ruth Winifred Howard became the second African-American woman in the United States to receive a Ph.D. in psychology, which she earned from the University of Minnesota.

1935: Jesse Jarue Mark became the first African American woman to earn a Ph.D. in botany, which she earned at Iowa State University.

1936: Flemmie Kittrell became the first African American woman to earn a Ph.D. in nutrition, which she earned at Cornell University.

1937: Anna Johnson Julian became the first African-American woman to receive a Ph.D. in sociology from the University of Pennsylvania.

1940: Roger Arliner Young became the first African-American woman to earn a Ph.D. in zoology, which she earned from the University of Pennsylvania. Marion Thompson Wright became the first African-American woman in the United States to earn a Ph.D. in History, which she earned at Columbia University.

1941: Ruth Lloyd became the first African-American woman to earn a Ph.D. in anatomy, which she earned from Western Reserve University.

1941: Merze Tate became the first African American woman to earn a Ph.D. in government and international relations from Harvard University.

1942: Margurite Thomas became the first African American woman to earn a Ph.D. in geology, which she earned from Catholic University.

1943: Euphemia Haynes became the first African-American woman to earn a Ph.D. in Mathematics, which she earned from Catholic University.

1945: Harvard Medical School admitted women for the first time.

1947: Marie Maynard Daly became the first African-American woman to earn a Ph.D. in chemistry, which she earned from Columbia University.

1949: Joanne Simpson (formerly Joanne Malkus, born Joanne Gerould) was the first woman in the United States to receive a Ph.D. in meteorology, which she received in 1949 from the University of Chicago.

1951: Maryly Van Leer Peck, became Vanderbilt University's first chemical engineer graduate. Peck also became the first woman to receive an M.S. and a Ph.D. in chemical engineering from the University of Florida.

1952: Georgia Tech's president Blake R. Van Leer admitted the first women to the school and his wife Ella Wall Van Leer setup support groups for future female engineers.

1962: Martha Bernal, who was born in Texas, became the first Latina to earn a PhD in psychology, which she earned in clinical psychology from Indiana University Bloomington.

1963: Grace Alele-Williams became the first Nigerian woman to earn any doctorate when she earned her Ph.D. in Mathematics Education from the University of Chicago.

1965: Sister Mary Kenneth Keller (1914? – 1985) became the first American woman to earn a PhD in Computer Science, which she earned at the University of Wisconsin–Madison. Her thesis was titled "Inductive Inference on Computer Generated Patterns."

1972: Title IX was passed, making discrimination against any person based on their sex in any federally funded educational program(s) in America illegal.

1972: Willie Hobbs Moore became the first African-American woman to earn a Ph.D. in Physics, which she earned from the University of Michigan.

1975: In 1975, Lorene Rogers became the first woman named president of a major research university, The University of Texas.

1975: On July 1, 1975, Jeanne Sinkford became the first female dean of a dental school when she was appointed the dean of Howard University, School of Dentistry.

1976: U.S. service academies (US Military Academy, US Naval Academy, US Air Force Academy and the US Coast Guard Academy) first admitted women in 1976.

1977: The American Association of Dental Schools (founded in 1923 and renamed the American Dental Education Association in 2000) had Nancy Goorey as its first female president in 1977.

1977–1978: For the first time, more associate degrees are conferred on women than men in the United States. More associate degrees have been conferred on women every year since.

1979: Christine Economides became the first American woman to earn a PhD in petroleum engineering, which she earned from Stanford University.

1979: Jenny Patrick became the first African-American woman in the United States to earn a Ph.D. in chemical engineering, which she earned from the Massachusetts Institute of Technology.

1980: Women and men were enrolled in American colleges in equal numbers for the first time.

1981–1982: For the first time, more bachelor's degrees are conferred on women than men in the United States. More bachelor's degrees have been conferred on women every year since.

1982: Mississippi University for Women v. Hogan, 458 U.S. 718 (1982) was a case decided 5–4 by the Supreme Court of the United States. The court held that the single-sex admissions policy of the Mississippi University for Women violated the Equal Protection Clause of the Fourteenth Amendment to the United States Constitution.

1982: Judith Hauptman earned her PhD in Talmudic studies from the Jewish Theological Seminary of New York, thus making her the first woman to earn a PhD in Talmud.

1983: Christine Darden became the first African-American woman in the U.S. to earn a Ph.D. degree in mechanical engineering, which she earned from George Washington University.

1984: The U.S. Supreme Court's 1984 ruling Grove City College v. Bell held that Title IX applied only to those programs receiving direct federal aid.  The case reached the Supreme Court when Grove City College disagreed with the Department of Education's assertion that it was required to comply with Title IX. Grove City College was not a federally funded institution; however, they did accept students who were receiving Basic Educational Opportunity Grants through a Department of Education program. The Department of Education's stance was that, because some of its students were receiving federal grants, the school was receiving federal assistance and Title IX applied to it. The Court decided that since Grove City College was only receiving federal funding through the grant program, only that program had to be in compliance. The ruling was a major victory for those opposed to Title IX, as it made many institutions' sports programs outside of the rule of Title IX and, thus, reduced the scope of Title IX.

1986–1987: For the first time, more master's degrees are conferred on women than men in the United States. More master's degrees have been conferred on women every year since.

1987: Johnnetta Cole became the first African-American president of Spelman College.

1988:  The Civil Rights Restoration Act was passed in 1988 which extended Title IX coverage to all programs of any educational institution that receives any federal assistance, both direct and indirect.

1994: Judith Rodin became the first permanent female president of an Ivy League University (specifically, the University of Pennsylvania.)

1994: In 1994, the Equity in Athletics Disclosure Act, sponsored by congresswoman Cardiss Collins, required federally assisted higher education institutions to disclose information on roster sizes for men's and women's teams, as well as budgets for recruiting, scholarships, coaches' salaries, and other expenses, annually.

1996: United States v. Virginia, was a landmark case in which the Supreme Court of the United States struck down the Virginia Military Institute (VMI)'s long-standing male-only admission policy in a 7–1 decision. (Justice Clarence Thomas, whose son was enrolled at VMI at the time, recused himself.)

2001: Ruth Simmons became the eighteenth president of Brown University, which made her the first African-American woman to lead an Ivy League institution.

2004–2005: For the first time, more doctoral degrees are conferred on women than men in the United States. More doctoral degrees have been conferred on women every year since. As of 2011, among adults 25 and older, 10.6 million U.S. women have master's degrees or higher, compared to 10.5 million men. Measured by shares, about 10.2 percent of women have advanced degrees compared to 10.9 percent of men—a gap steadily narrowing in recent years. Women still trail men in professional subcategories such as business, science and engineering, but when it comes to finishing college, roughly 20.1 million women have bachelor's degrees, compared to nearly 18.7 million men—a gap of more than 1.4 million that has remained steady in recent years.

2006: On November 24, 2006, the Title IX regulations were amended to provide greater flexibility in the operation of single-sex classes or extracurricular activities at the primary or secondary school level.

See also
 Women's colleges in the United States
 Timeline of women's colleges in the United States
 List of girls' schools in the United States
 Educational Inequality
 Education in the United States
 Coeducation
 History of education in the United States
 Female seminary

References

Further reading
 Eisenmann, Linda. Historical Dictionary of Women's Education in the United States (1998) online
 Gordon, Lynn D. Gender and Higher Education in the Progressive Era (1990).
 Hine, Darlene Clark, ed. Black Women in America: An Historical Encyclopedia (2 vols. 1993).
 Hobbs, Catherine, ed. Nineteenth-Century Women Learn to Write (1995).
 Horowitz, Helen Lefkowitz. Alma Mater: Design and Experience in the Women's Colleges from Their Nineteenth-Century Beginnings to the 1930s (1984).
 Kornbluh, Joyce, and Mary Frederickson, eds. Sisterhood and Solidarity: Workers' Education for Women, 1914–1984 (1984).
 Lasser, Carol, ed. Educating Men and Women Together: Coeducation in a Changing World (1987).
 Murphy, Marjorie. Blackboard Unions: The AFT and the NEA, 1900–1980 (1990).
 Oates, Mary J., ed. Higher Education for Catholic Women: An Historical Anthology (Garland, 1987).
 Rury, John L. Education and Women's Work: Female Schooling and the Division of Labor in Urban America, 1870–1930 (1991).
 Sicherman, Barbara, and Carol Hurd Green, eds. Notable American Women: The Modern Period (4 vol. Belknap Press, 1980).
 Solomon, Barbara Miller. In the Company of Educated Women: A History of Women and Higher Education in America (1985).
 Walch, Timothy. Parish School: American Catholic Parochial Education from Colonial Times to the Present (1996).
 Woody, Thomas. A History of Women's Education in the United States (2 vols. 1929)(. 
 Wyman, Andrea. Rural Women Teachers in the United States: A Sourcebook (Scarecrow Press, 1996).

Historiography
 Eisenmann, Linda. “Reconsidering a Classic: Assessing the History of Women's Higher Education a Dozen Years after Barbara Solomon.” Harvard Educational Review, 67 (Winter 1997): 689–717.
 Nash, Margaret A. "The historiography of education for girls and women in the United States." in William J  Reese, William J. and John J. Rury, eds.Rethinking the History of American Education (2008) pp 143–159.   excerpt
 McClelland, Averil Evans. The education of women in the United States: A guide to theory, teaching, and research (Routledge, 2014).
 Seller, Maxine Schwartz, ed. Women Educators in the United States, 1820–1993: A BioBibliographic Sourcebook (Greenwood Press, 1994).

External links
 "Married Teachers" Los Angeles Herald, March 16, 1900—editorial arguing against employment of married teachers in Los Angeles, California
 

 
United States
History of women in the United States